Dawa Ongju Sherpa-  (born December 17, 1972) is a Nepalese Sherpa mountain climber. He has climbed 13 of the 14 highest mountains in the world.

Early life
Born in Makalu Village, Sankhuwasabha district, Nepal, Dawa is the fifth child, among seven siblings, from his father Namgyal Sherpa and mother Doma Sherpa. He travelled to Darjeeling, India to work and train at the Himalayan Mountaineering Institute (HMI Darjeeling) to acquire mountaineering skills to climb the Himalayas and Karakoram.

Mountaineering career
In 2000, he climbed his first eight thousander, Kangchenjunga. He continues to work on his eight thousander mission.

Eight thousanders
Dawa is currently pursuing an ambitious goal of climbing 14 eight thousanders at a speed record. He kicked off this initiative with Pasdawa Sherpa and Kristin Harila from April 2022 and had the aim of completing it by May 2023, climbing six peaks (Annapurna (April 28, 2022), Dhaulagiri (May 8, 2022), Kangchenjunga (May 14, 2022), Everest (May 22, 2022), Lhotse (May 22, 2022) and Makalu (May 27, 2022) in just 29 days, thereby setting the record of fastest climb.

He climbed additional peaks in Pakistan and again in Nepal: Nanga Parbat (July 1, 2022), K2 (July 22, 2022), Broad Peak (July 28, 2022), Gasherbrum II (August 8, 2022),  Gasherbrum I (August 11, 2022) and Manaslu on September 22, 2022, but abruptly stopped leaving Shishapangma and Cho Oyu still waiting to be climbed. Dawa is determined to complete his 14 eight thousanders goal by Spring 2023.

Climbing records
 Climbed Six 8000ers peaks located within Nepal in a record 29 days
 “Double Header” Everest Summit to Lhotse Summit - 8hrs 35mins - May 22, 2022

Notable ascents

References

1972 births
Living people
Sherpa summiters of Mount Everest
Nepalese mountain climbers